Web is a science fiction novel  by the English writer John Wyndham. The novel was published by the estate of John Wyndham in 1979, ten years after his death.

Plot summary

The events depicted in Web are written from the viewpoint of Arnold Delgrange, a man whose wife and daughter were recently killed in a motor collision. They revolve around a failed attempt to establish a utopian colony on the fictional island Tanakuatua in the Pacific Ocean, far from civilisation.

After a slow start setting the scene with the mysterious "Project" being financed by the wealthy and eccentric Lord Foxfield, the island is purchased and a team of volunteers sets out by steamer for the island. A summarised back-story provides commentary on the colonising powers' impact on the native population during the 19th and 20th centuries.

Tanakuatua is now uninhabited by humans, as its native inhabitants were evacuated from the island due to British nuclear testing and were relocated.  However a small group of natives refused the evacuation order and placed a curse on any people who returned to the island.  When Delgrange and his fellow pioneers reach the island they are irritated and frustrated by a bizarre ceremony that their native porters conduct before proceeding with the unloading of their supplies from the steamer which brought them. As the steamer departs and disappears over the horizon, due to return in six months, a sense of their solitude descends. They compose messages to their friends and family to be transmitted by radio, but the radio operator returns looking agitated. When Delgrange follows him to investigate, they find that the transmitter has been crushed beneath a heavy packing case. Clearly they are not alone on the island after all, and from this point on the sense of brooding menace steadily intensifies.

Eventually they discover that the island has been overrun by spiders that hunt in packs.

References

1979 British novels
1979 science fiction novels
English science fiction novels
Novels by John Wyndham
Novels published posthumously
Novels set in Oceania
1979 in England
Novels set on islands
Michael Joseph books